Wow is a 1969 Québécois film directed by Claude Jutra, produced by the National Film Board of Canada.

Synopsis
Claude Jutra's first feature-length film is an improvised docudrama about the lives and dreams of nine Montreal young people. The film is made up of nine separate episodes, each one expressing a particular fantasy of one member of the group. This exuberant, low-budget effort, shot in the style of the French New Wave films, provides hints of Jutra's immense talents as a director.

Production
Subjects in the film included some participants Jutra had worked with in his 1966 mockumentary film The Devil's Toy (Rouli-roulant), a faux-anti-skateboarding propaganda film.

Sequel
Thirty years after the production of Wow, the NFB co-produced a sequel Wow 2, using the same concept of adolescents acting out their dreams.

References

Works cited

External links

Watch Wow at the National Film Board of Canada (in French)

1969 films
1960s French-language films
National Film Board of Canada films
Films shot in Montreal
Films directed by Claude Jutra
Films about wish fulfillment
Canadian teen films
Films scored by Pierre F. Brault
Canadian docudrama films
French-language Canadian films
1960s Canadian films